William Peirce Ennis (January 30, 1878 – July 28, 1968) was a United States Army officer in the early 20th century. He received the Distinguished Service Medal.

Biography

Ennis was born in the Presidio of San Francisco on January 30, 1878, though he spent much of his early life in Newport, Rhode Island. His father, William Ennis, was a veteran of the American Civil War and Spanish–American War who attained the rank of brigadier general and from 1933 to 1938 was the oldest living graduate of the United States Military Academy at West Point. Ennis graduated from West Point in 1901 and was commissioned in the Artillery Corps.

Ennis served at Fort Hamilton from 1901 to 1904, West Point from 1904 to 1908, and at Fort Reno from 1908 to 1911. He was considered one of the best trainers of artillery horses in the country. Ennis went to the Philippines in 1912 with the First Battalion of the First Field Artillery, though he and the others rejoined the rest of the regiment in 1913. He returned to West Point in 1915 in order to command his artillery detachment. In late 1917, Ennis went to Fort Sill in order to serve as a senior instructor in the Department of Materiel of the School of Fire. He was promoted to Colonel in May 1918 and served as the director of the Department of Materiel, for which he received the Distinguished Service Medal. After Ennis's promotion to the rank of brigadier general on August 8, 1918, he assumed command over the 13th Field Artillery Regiment brigade stationed at Fort Lewis.

After World War I ended, Ennis reverted to the rank of major and spent six years as a student at the United States Army War College, and he served on the General Staff assignments. From 1922 to 1925, he served as a G-4 in Panama. From 1929 to 1931, Ennis commanded the Second Battalion of the 16th Field Artillery and afterward had General Staff duty in Boston. He commanded the 6th Field Artillery at Fort Hoyle in Maryland for three years. In addition to these positions, Ennis usually commanded the First Field Artillery Brigade and the post at the same time.  Ennis' last assignment was as commander of the 82nd Infantry Division, which would be converted to an airborne division during World War II, from 1 September 1939 to 31 August 1941.

After retiring from the military in 1941, Ennis and his family moved to Martha's Vineyard, where they lived for 27 years. He died on July 28, 1968.

Personal life
Ennis married Eda Totten on April 25, 1903. He is the father of William P. Ennis, who became a lieutenant general and served as the president of the Army War College.

References

Bibliography

1878 births
1968 deaths
People from San Francisco
People from Newport, Rhode Island
People from Martha's Vineyard, Massachusetts
United States Army generals
Recipients of the Distinguished Service Medal (US Army)
United States Military Academy alumni
United States Army War College alumni
United States Army generals of World War I
Military personnel from California
Military personnel from Massachusetts
United States Army Field Artillery Branch personnel